Asiyab-e Kohneh (also Romanized as Āsīyāb-e Kohneh; also known as Mollā Khaleyl) is a village in Tarq Rud Rural District, in the Central District of Natanz County, Isfahan Province, Iran. At the 2006 census, its population was 28, in 9 families.

References 

Populated places in Natanz County